Bi-metallic coins are coins consisting of two (bi-) metals or alloys, generally arranged with an outer ring around a contrasting center. Common circulating examples include the €1, €2, United Kingdom £1 and £2, Canadian $2, South Africa R5, Turkish 1 lira and 50 kurus, Indian ₹10 and ₹20, Indonesian Rp1,000, 2 and 5 PLN, 50 CZK, 100 and 200 HUF, 1 and 2 BGN, Hong Kong $10, Argentine $1 and $2, Brazilian R$1, Chilean $100 and $500, Colombian $500 and $1000, and all Mexican coins of $1 or higher denomination.

History

Bi-metallic coins and medals have been issued for a long time. The Roman Empire issued special-occasion, large medallions with a center of bronze or copper and an outer ring of orichalcum, starting with the reign of Hadrian. Meanwhile, circulating bi-metallic coins are known from the 17th century. English farthings from 1684 through 1693 were made of tin with a central plug of copper for value. The silver-center cent pattern produced by the United States in 1792 is another example.

In the 1830s and 1840s, British medalist Joseph Moore produced large numbers of bi-metallic "penny model" and less common "halfpenny model" tokens, as a proposal to replace the relatively large penny and halfpenny coins. Though not legal tender, Moore's tokens were circulated widely and accepted at face value by many merchants. Despite their popularity, the Royal Mint rejected the proposal, and did not reduce the size of the penny and halfpenny until decimalization.

The first modern circulating bi-metallic coin was the Italian 500 lire, first issued in 1982. Based on the minting process of the lire coin, the following issued bi-metallic coins for circulation were issued:

 Morocco, with its 5-dirhams coin in 1987;
 France, with a 10-francs coin in 1988;
 Monaco, with a 10 francs;
 Thailand, with a 10 baht, in 1988;
 Hong Kong, with a $10 coin, in 1993;
 Indonesia, with a Rp1,000 coin, in 1993;
 Canada, with a $2 coin (nicknamed "toonie") in 1996;
 Hungary, with a 100-forint coin in 1996 and a 200 forint coin in 2009;
 Brazil with the 1 real coin, in 1998;
 The United Kingdom has issued a bi-metallic £2 coin since 1997, and a bi-metallic £1 coin since March 2017;
 The Philippines has minted a bi-metallic 10-peso coin from 2000 to 2017 and a 20-peso coin since 2019.
 The Eurozone circulated the €1 and €2 coins on 1 January 2002;
 India has issued a bi-metallic ₹10 coin since 2009 and a bi-metallic ₹20 coin since 2019;
 Singapore has issued a bi-metallic 1-dollar coin since 2013.
 Japan has issued a bi-metallic 500 yen coin since 2021.
 Costa Rica announced a bi-metallic 500-colones coin that will start to circulate in November 2021.

The first ever tri-metallic circulating coins were 20-francs coins introduced in France and Monaco in 1992. These were similar to the corresponding bi-metallic 10-francs coins, but had two rings instead of one.

Use
As well as circulating coins, where they are generally restricted to high-denomination coins, bi-metallic coins are often used in commemorative issues, often made of precious metals. For example, the only bi-metallic coin issued by the United States is the $10 Library of Congress commemorative, made of a gold ring around a platinum center. They are used primarily as a way of securing against coin counterfeiting.

Manufacturing

The manufacturing process is similar to that of ordinary coins, except that two blanks (the inner and the outer) are struck at the same time, deforming the separate blanks sufficiently to hold them together.

Countries

Examples

References

External links
 

Numismatics
Bimetal